Tyrone DuBose (born May 4, 1960 in Cincinnati, Ohio) is an American radio personality, actor, voice artist, and television contributor. He is a daily contributor on The Sheryl Underwood Radio Show, and show contributor on the hour-long music documentary program, Unsung, that airs on TV One.

DuBose is a five-time R&B Historian Winner including The Black Music Awards, and received a lifetime achievement award from UVIEW Media Group in Los Angeles California. DuBose' radio career began in 2003 at KHWY in Barstow, California.

References

1960 births
Living people
American radio personalities